Camellia pleurocarpa is a species of plant in the family Theaceae. It is endemic to Vietnam.

References

pleurocarpa
Endemic flora of Vietnam
Trees of Vietnam
Vulnerable plants
Taxonomy articles created by Polbot